The Arthur Raycraft House, on Booker St. in Tonopah, Nevada, United States, is a historic stone house that was built in 1906.  It was listed on the National Register of Historic Places in 1982.  It was deemed significant for its association with banker and businessman Arthur G. Raycraft, and for its substantial architecture.

See also 
Raycraft Ranch, also NRHP-listed in Nevada

References 

Houses in Nye County, Nevada
Tonopah, Nevada
Houses completed in 1906
Houses on the National Register of Historic Places in Nevada
National Register of Historic Places in Tonopah, Nevada
Queen Anne architecture in Nevada
1906 establishments in Nevada